Jane Alison Langdale,  (born 1960) is a British geneticist and academic. She is Professor of Plant Development in the Department of Biology at the University of Oxford and a Professorial Fellow at The Queen's College, Oxford.

Education
Langdale was educated at Barr's Hill Grammar School in Coventry and the University of Bath, where she was awarded a Bachelor of Science degree in Applied Biology in 1982, specialising in microbiology. Her PhD was in human genetics and carried out at St Mary's Hospital Medical School and Charing Cross and Westminster Medical School and awarded by the University of London.

Career and research
Following her PhD, Langdale was employed for five years as a postdoctoral researcher at Yale University with Tim Nelson. She returned to the UK in 1990, to work in the Department of Plant Sciences (since 2022 the Department of Biology) where she has worked since. Langdale's research interests are in two main areas:

 the evolution of leaf development and meristem function in bryophytes, lycophytes and monilophytes
 the evolution and development of kranz anatomy in C4 plants,

Langdale's research has been funded by the Biotechnology and Biological Sciences Research Council (BBSRC)  and has been published in leading peer reviewed scientific journals including Nature, Science, Current Opinion in Plant Biology, Development, Gene, Trends in Genetics,The Plant Cell, Annual Review of Plant Biology, Planta, Plant Physiology, Journal of Cell Science, The EMBO Journal, The Plant Journal, PLOS ONE Genes & Development and  the New Phytologist.

Langdale is the co-author of the book How to Succeed as a Scientist: From Postdoc to Professor with materials scientist Barbara Gabrys. She featured on the BBC series, Plants: From Roots to Riches in 2014 with Kathy Willis.

Awards and honours
Langdale was elected a Fellow of the Royal Society (FRS) in 2015. Her certificate of election reads: 

Langdale was elected a member of the European Molecular Biology Organization (EMBO) in 2007 and appointed Commander of the Most Excellent Order of the British Empire (CBE) in the 2018 Birthday Honours for services to Plant Science. She was awarded a Doctor of Science degree (DSc) honoris causa by the University of Bath in 2018.

She was elected a foreign associate of the National Academy of Sciences of the United States in April 2019.

She was elected a corresponding member of the Australian Academy of Science in 2020.

Personal life
Langdale has always had Airedale Terriers and is the elder sibling of the barrister Rachel Langdale King's Counsel (KC).

References

Living people
Fellows of The Queen's College, Oxford
Commanders of the Order of the British Empire
Fellows of the Royal Society
Members of the European Molecular Biology Organization
Female Fellows of the Royal Society
1960 births
People educated at Barr's Hill School
Foreign associates of the National Academy of Sciences